Phlebology, The Journal of Venous Disease, is a peer-reviewed medical journal covering research on vascular disease. It is published by SAGE Publications and is an official journal of the American College of Phlebology, the Australasian College of Phlebology, the Venous Forum of the Royal Society of Medicine, the European Venous Forum, and the Benelux Society. The editor-in-chief is Alun Davies.

Abstracting and indexing 
The journal is abstracted and indexed in PubMed/MEDLINE and the Science Citation Index. According to the Journal Citation Reports, the journal has a 2012 impact factor of 1.458, ranking it 47th out of 67 listed journals in the category "Peripheral Vascular Disease".

References

External links 
 
 The American College of Phlebology
 The Australasian College of Phlebology
 The Venous Forum of the Royal Society of Medicine
 The European Venous Forum
The Benelux Society

Cardiology journals
SAGE Publishing academic journals
Publications established in 1986
English-language journals